Stuart W. Holliday is the President and CEO of the Meridian International Center, nonprofit organization that works with the U.S. Department of State, U.S. embassies, governments, public and private sector organizations, and leaders worldwide to promote global diplomacy,  leadership development, educational, cultural exchanges, and diplomatic policy programs. Holliday is the former U.S. Ambassador for Special Political Affairs at the United Nations and Special Assistant to President George W. Bush, and Associate Director of Presidential Personnel.

Early life and education 
Stuart Holliday was born in Malawi, the son of United States diplomats.

He attended Avon Old Farms School in Avon, Connecticut. He obtained his B.S.F.S. in International Affairs from the School of Foreign Service at Georgetown University, and his M.S., also in International Affairs, from the London School of Economics and Political Science.

Early career 
Holliday joined the United States Navy in 1988, and served as an Officer until 1995 on active and reserve duty. He was active for Operation Desert Storm and is a recipient of the Joint Service Commendation Medal.

During his service in 1992, Holliday worked for the George H. W. Bush United States presidential election re-election campaign. From 1993 to 1995, he was Regional Director for North Africa, the Middle East and Turkey at the International Republican Institute. In 1996, he jointed the Dallas Council on World Affairs as its executive director, a role he held into 1997. From 1998 to 2000, he was the Assistant Policy Director in Texas for then Governor George W. Bush.

Political career and foreign affairs 
During the first year of George W. Bush's presidency, from 2000 to 2001, Holliday was Special Assistant to the President and Associate Director of Presidential Personnel at the White House. After the September 11 attacks, he collaborated in staffing the first Office of Homeland Security with government agencies. Thereafter, he served as Coordinator for International Information Programs for the U.S. Department of State as well as Principal Deputy Assistant Secretary for Public Affairs.

Holliday became the United States Ambassador to the United Nations for Special Political Affairs in December 2003, serving in that role until 2005, with a focus on the U.N. Security Council.

Post-political career 
After his service as an ambassador, Holliday became affiliated with Quinn Gillespie & Associates. In 2006, he became President and CEO of Meridian International Center. On May 2, 2022, Holliday was honored with the Chevalier de la Légion d’Honneur, France's highest and oldest award, by His Excellency Philippe Étienne, Ambassador of France to the U.S.

Media appearances 
Holliday is a frequent media commenter. He has provided perspectives in major US and international media outlets, including views on: Iran’s Long-term Intentions for Nuclear Negotiations (November 2013), Russia’s Strategy About Public Diplomacy (September 2013), UN Security Council’s Response to Chemical Weapons in Syria (August 2013), Civil Protests in Turkey (June 2013), President Barack Obama’s visit to the Middle East (March 2013), Israel/Gaza Conflict (November 2012), Delicate Diplomacy in the Middle East (November 2012), Ceasefires Often Fragile in the Middle East (November 2012), and the UN’s Interventions in Libya.

Published works 
Holliday has written broadly on international issues over thirty years, with a focus on the development of civil society in the Middle East and North Africa. His published works include papers on Oman, Yemen, and the Western Sahara in 1994, an IRI Fact-Finding Mission to the Western Sahara (1993), and Oman and Popular Participation in Government (1995).

In addition, Holliday writes op-eds on foreign policy issues and international affairs.

Speaking engagements 
Holliday often speaks at international conferences and moderates roundtable discussions on major international issues, including:
 Young Professional Organization (YPO) events
 Georgetown University
 The Washington Diplomat’s Country Promotions Strategies Conference
 The Diplomatic Courier's Future of Jobs Global Summit
 The Global Leadership Summit

Personal life 
Holliday is married to Gwen Moore Holliday, Vice President of DCI Group and they have two sons.

References 

Ambassadors of the United States
American nonprofit chief executives
Living people
United States Assistant Secretaries of State
Walsh School of Foreign Service alumni
Alumni of the London School of Economics
Year of birth missing (living people)
Avon Old Farms alumni